George Mills (March 1793 – August 1865) was an English professional cricketer who played first-class cricket from 1825 to 1831. He was mainly associated with Kent teams and made nine known appearances in first-class matches.

Mills was born at Benenden in Kent into a family of cricketers. He made his first-class debut in 1825 against a Sussex XI at Brighton, playing alongside his brother Richard. He made eight appearances for Kent sides between then and 1829. Mills' final first-class appearance was for the Players in the Gentlemen v Players of 1831. It is reported that the invitation to play in the match was meant to be made to Richard, but that, due to the method of addressing professionals simply by their surname, was misunderstood.

Mills died at Rolvenden in Kent in 1865 aged 72.

References

External links

1793 births
1865 deaths
English cricketers
English cricketers of 1787 to 1825
English cricketers of 1826 to 1863
Players cricketers
Kent cricketers
People from Rolvenden
People from Benenden